The 1897 Greensburg Athletic Association season was their eighth season in existence. The team finished 10–1.

Schedule

Game notes

References

Greensburg Athletic Association
Greensburg Athletic Association seasons
Greensburg Athletic Association